IDEmøbler is a Danish chain of furniture stores, founded in 1969. In some countries, it is known by the name of its holding company IDesign. The company runs over 30 stores in Denmark and has subsidiaries and affiliates in the Nordic countries and the Middle East.

See also 
 ILVA

References

External links 
 Official IDEmøbler website

Furniture retailers
Retail companies of Denmark 
Retail companies established in 1969
Danish companies established in 1969